Cecilia Gallerani (early 1473 – 1536) was the favourite and most celebrated of the many mistresses of Ludovico Sforza, known as Lodovico il Moro, Duke of Milan.  She is best known as the subject of Leonardo da Vinci's painting The Lady with an Ermine (circa 1489).  While posing for the painting, she invited Leonardo, who at the time was working as court artist for Sforza, to meetings at which Milanese intellectuals discussed philosophy and other subjects.  Cecilia herself presided over these discussions.

Family and early life 
Cecilia was born in early 1473 into a large family from Siena. Her father's name was Fazio Gallerani. He was not a member of the nobility, but he occupied several important posts at the Milanese court, including the position of ambassador to Republic of Florence and Duchy of Lucca. Her mother was Margherita Busti, the daughter of a noted doctor of law.

She was educated alongside her six brothers in Latin and literature. In 1483 at the age of ten, Cecilia was betrothed to Stefano Visconti, but the betrothal was broken off in 1487 for unknown reasons. In May 1489, she left home for the Monastero Nuovo, and it was possibly there where she met Ludovico.

Mistress of Ludovico Sforza 
Cecilia spoke Latin fluently and was said to be a gifted musician and singer. She also wrote poetry. In about 1489, she sat for Ludovico's court artist and engineer, Leonardo da Vinci, who painted her celebrated portrait, which is known as The Lady with an Ermine. Isabella d'Este, an admirer of the work of Leonardo da Vinci, asked to borrow the portrait, but Cecilia replied it no longer looked like her because she had been so young then and "nobody seeing it and me together would suppose it was made for me". "Though reluctant because it no longer resembled her, Cecilia complied, and by the following month the picture was gratefully returned".

Even after Ludovico married Beatrice d'Este, Cecilia continued to keep her apartments in Ludovico's castle.  She had a son by Ludovico, Cesare, on 3 May 1491.

When Beatrice d'Este found out about their relationship, Ludovico was constrained to ask Cecilia to leave the Porta Giovia castle, the seat of the ducal court. She was first installed in the Verme Palace, and then given the Carmagnola Palace in 1492, when she married Count Ludovico Carminati de' Brambilla, known as "Il Bergamino". She bore her husband four children. After the deaths of both her husband and her son (1514–1515), she retired to San Giovanni in Croce, a castle near Cremona.

Cesare, the son of Cecilia and Ludovico Sforza was made abbot of the Church of San Nazaro Maggiore of Milan in 1498; in 1505, he became canon of Milan. He died in 1512.

Death and legacy 
Cecilia died on an unknown date in 1536. She was allegedly buried in the Carminati family tomb in the Church of San Zavedro.

Bandello described her as a patron of the arts. According to others, hers was the first salon in Europe.

Cultural references 
The Leonardo portrait of Cecilia plays an important role in the plot of the alternative historical novel Fatherland by Robert Harris. In the novel the painting is misappropriated by corrupt Nazi officials during the World War 2. The book's epilogue states that in real life, the portrait 'was recovered from Germany at the end of the war and returned to Poland.'

References

Further reading 
 
 .
 .

External links 
 Leonardo da Vinci: anatomical drawings from the Royal Library, Windsor Castle, exhibition catalog fully online as PDF from The Metropolitan Museum of Art, which contains material on Cecilia Gallerani (see index)

1473 births
1536 deaths
15th-century Italian women
15th-century Italian people
16th-century Italian people
House of Sforza
Italian artists' models
Italian Renaissance people
Italian salon-holders
16th-century Italian women
Renaissance women
Italian patrons of the arts